Koi Jaane Na is a 2021 Indian Hindi-language psychological thriller film directed by Amin Hajee and starring Kunal Kapoor and Amyra Dastur. The film was theatrically released in India on 2 April 2021.

Plot 

The film starts with Kabir in disguise trying to look for something or someone at the discotheque, “EGO”. In a scuffle, he kills drug dealer, Vicky Singhania, with his own taser. Outside the police are planning a raid on the discotheque to capture Vicky. Kabir calmly walks away after the inspector on duty identifies him as the famous inspirational writer and blogger, Kabir. 

Kabir, however, has other problems in his professional life. A court order gives him three months of relief from the contractual obligation with a publishing house. Kabir was legally required to deliver the second half of his bestseller within six months and failed. They were also given exclusive rights to him, so he cannot write for any other publishing house. His ex-wife Rashmi, now married to the owner of this publishing house, wants to destroy Kabir and take all his possessions i.e. an ancestral home in Panchgani and his jeep that he is very fond of. She suspects that he is writing for someone else as she had received almost his entire wealth in alimony and yet he is still able to lead a comfortable life. She employs private detective, Ricky Rosario, to investigate.

On his way to Panchgani, Kabir meets Suhana and takes a liking to her. Suhana works as a receptionist at a resort and enjoys his company. In Panchgani, Ricky is thorough with his job and heavily bribes Bindia, the daughter of the gardener of Kabir's home, to keep an eye on him. When Kabir's is away with Suhana, Ricky breaks in while on the phone with Rashmi. She guides him to a secret room and asks him to check the room for any clues. Ricky finds a hidden laptop and is able to unlock it and extract evidence, proving that Kabir is the ghostwriter for the "Zaran Khan" novel series, which violates his agreement with his current publishing house. However, Ricky tells Rashmi that he was unable to unlock the laptop and found nothing of significance.

Later, Ricky meets Kabir to tell him that he would not expose his secret if he pays him three times what Rashmi is paying. Deeply worried, he first tells everything to Suhana and shows her his secret room. Instead of being angry, Suhana is impressed and creates a plan to help him. They meet Ricky to tell him that Kabir would reveal that Ricky is the ghostwriter of Zaran Khan and can take all the proceeds from the royalty of this series. Ricky outrightly rejects this, stating he only wants the cash. That night he is found murdered on the highway with his phone crushed. Police Officer Ashwini Kalsekar investigating the murder considers Kabir as the prime suspect because Ricky had earlier registered a case against Kabir of threatening his live as a pre-emptive action to his blackmail plan. Suhana gives a false statement that she was with him during the time of the murder  to save Kabir. Later, she is worried about Ricky's photographer friend who might expose Kabir's secret. She finds his studio's address and visits him that night. She peers inside to see him describing his blackmailing techniques to a man who suddenly slashes his throat. The mysterious man comes out and threatens Suhana to shut her mouth or he would eliminate her along with Kabir.

Kabir takes her home but on the way they see a crowd. Kabir stops to investigate and learns about the murder. Meanwhile, Suhana quietly collects her hair clip she had lost there earlier. They return home to find the police officer investigating his secret room. Kabir narrates the entire story to her but she is convinced that only Kabir has a motive for both the murders. Kabir explains to her that he has already found a solution with his lawyer and they would backdate his contracts for the Zaran Khan series to escape the mess. He has already revealed his identity on his blog. Since there is no evidence, she cannot arrest him but asks both of them to visit her office the next day. 

Later they night, Suhana tells Kabir about her tragic past witnessing her drunk father kill her mother and sister. The next day Suhana tells Kabir she witnessed the second murder. Kabir encourages her to report this to the police. As they approach the police station, Suhana sees the murderer coming out of the police station and asks Kabir to drive away. Kabir drops her at her workplace before going back to the station to learn the identity of the killer. The officer in charge tells him that the person who left the police station is Dr. Rao from St. Paul's hospital in Bangalore, who was first arrested for molestation charges but they let him go because the said victim withdrew her complaint. Kabir visits the hospital and learns that St Paul's hospital is actually a mental asylum and Dr. Rao has left to search for a patient. 

Finally, there is a faceoff between Suhana and Dr. Rao. She snatches the gun from the police officer and threatens to kill him. Kabir intervenes and reveals the patient Dr. Rao is looking for, is her. 

That fateful night after she witnessed her father murdering her family, Suhana killed her father. This lead her to suffer from schizophrenia. To help with her illness, she receives treatment from Dr. Rao at St. Paul's. After a staff member tries to molest her, she runs away from the hospital. Her condition deteriorates without her medicine, so when Kabir is threatened by Ricky, her alter ego takes over and she commits the two murders. Kabir is able to calm her down and she surrenders. 

She is shown to be recovering at St Paul's hospital where Kabir visits her every day. Dr. Rao and the officer discuss the couple and Dr. Rao tells the officer that Suhana is getting better. The charges against were dropped due to her mental condition and by next week, Kabir might be able to take her home. However, the officer is not convinced as she tells Dr. Rao that the case is not over for her as the murders in Zaraan Khan’s novels have actually taken place and she is sure Kabir is infact, Zaraan Khan. Once Suhana is released, Suhana and Kabir might become a dangerous and powerful duo. Though Dr. Rao tells her that Kabir is simply a writer, the officer is not convinced and leaves telling Dr. Rao that they will meet again. After she leaves, Dr. Rao thinks about her words while looking at Kabir and Suhana.

Cast
 Kunal Kapoor as Kabir Kapoor
 Amyra Dastur as Suhana
 Neha Mahajan as Bindiya
 Vidya Malvade as Rashmi 	
 Ashwini Kalsekar as Police Officer
 Naufal Azmir Khan as Nikhil
 Karim Hajee as Ricky Rosario	
 Raj Zutshi as Raj, Suhana's father	
 Aditya Lakhia	as Aditya	
 Javed Khan as Inspector
 Aditi Govitrikar as Suhana's mother
 Kamlesh Sawant as Police Inspector
 Viraf Patel as Vicky Singhania	
 Achint Kaur as Kabir's friend	
 Randeep Arya as Randeep
 Sameer Khandekar as Chandrakant	
 Atul Kulkarni as Dr. Rao
 Aamir Khan as Special appearance in the song "Har Funn Maula"
 Elli AvrRam as Special appearance in the song "Har Funn Maula"

Production
The principal photography of the film started in mid-January 2019.

Soundtrack 

The film's music is composed by Tanishk Bagchi, Amaal Mallik, Rochak Kohli and Vikram Negi while the lyrics are written by Amitabh Bhattacharya, Kumaar, Manoj Muntashir and Sham Deewana.

Release 
The film was scheduled to release on 26 March 2021 but was pushed to 2 April 2021.

References

External links 

 
 

2021 films
Indian psychological thriller films
2020s Hindi-language films